The Jordan League Division 1 is the second-level football competition in Jordan. Al-Ahli are the most recent champions in 2022 season.

Promotion and relegation
The winner and runner-up are promoted to the Jordan Premier League directly. The bottom two clubs are relegated to the Jordan League Division 2.

Teams
Table as of 2022 Season:

Club performances

See also
 Jordan Football Association

References

External links
 
 

Football leagues in Jordan
Second level football leagues in Asia